Harland Stimson "Hypie" Rowe (April 20, 1896 – May 26, 1969), was an American professional baseball third baseman who played in  with the Philadelphia Athletics of Major League Baseball. He batted left and threw right-handed. Rowe had a .139 batting average in 17 games, five hits in 36 at-bats, in his one year in the major leagues. He was born and died in Springvale, Maine.

He attended the University of Maine, where he played college baseball for the Black Bears from 1914–1916.

References

External links

1896 births
1969 deaths
Major League Baseball infielders
Baseball players from Maine
Philadelphia Athletics players
People from Sanford, Maine
Maine Black Bears baseball players